Johann Wilhelm "Rukeli" Trollmann (27 December 1907 – April 1944) was a German Sinti boxer.

Trollmann became famous in the late 1920s. On 9 June 1933, he fought for the German light-heavyweight title and although he clearly led by points over his opponent Adolf Witt, the fight was judged "no result". The audience rebelled, and the Nazi officials were forced to acknowledge Trollmann as the victor. However, six days later he was stripped of the title. A new fight was scheduled for 21 July, with Gustav Eder as Trollmann's opponent. Trollmann was threatened that he had to change his "dancing" style or lose his licence. Trollmann arrived the day of the match with his hair dyed blonde and his face whitened with flour, the caricature of an Aryan. He took the blows of his opponent as he was asked for five rounds before he collapsed.

The persecution of Sinti and Roma in Germany dramatically increased in the following years. Sterilization often preceded their internment in concentration camps, and Trollmann too underwent this operation. In 1939 he was drafted into the Wehrmacht, and fought on the eastern front. He was wounded in 1941 and was returned to Germany as a result. The Gestapo arrested him in June 1942, and he was interned in Neuengamme concentration camp. He tried to keep a low profile, but the camp commandant had been a boxing official before the war and recognized Trollmann. He used Trollmann as a trainer for his troops during the nights. The prisoners committee decided to act, as Trollmann's health deteriorated. They faked his death and managed to get him transferred to the adjacent camp of Wittenberge under an assumed identity. The former star was soon recognized and the prisoners organized a fight between him and Emil Cornelius, a former criminal and hated Kapo (a prisoner given privileges for taking on responsibilities in the camp, often a convict working for a reduced sentence or parole). Trollmann won, Cornelius sought revenge for his humiliation and forced Trollmann to work all day until he was exhausted, before attacking and killing him with a shovel. Trollmann was 36 years old.

Rehabilitation and commemoration

In 2003, the German boxing federation officially recognised Trollmann as the winner of the 1933 championship.

On 9 June 2010, the anniversary of his championship fight, the German artist collective Bewegung Nurr erected a temporary memorial "9841" in the Berlin Victoria Park to honour Trollmann. The memorial was also displayed the following year in Hannover and in Dresden in 2012 for six weeks. The title refers to Trollmann's prison number.

In 2015, the Italian alternative rock band C.F.F. e il Nomade Venerabile released the song Come fiori dedicated to Trollmann. This song was the inspiration for the theathral show My Inv(f)erno... gypsy life which opened the X edition of the International TeatroLab Festival at the Tagliavini theatre in Novellara in March 2019.

In 2016, Dario Fo, recipient of the 1997 Nobel Prize in Literature, published the book Razza di zingaro based on Trollmann's life.

In 2022, the German television series Babylon Berlin season four, a fictional version of Trollmann is portrayed by Hannes Wegener and is revealed to be the half-brother of one of the series' leads, Lotte Ritter. A fight takes place between Trollman and Willy Bolze, who in real life was Trollman's first professional boxing opponent. The dates are different in the show with their fight taking place in 1931 instead of 1929.

Professional boxing record

References

External links
 

1907 births
1944 deaths
German Sinti people
People who died in Neuengamme concentration camp
Romani sportspeople
German people of Romani descent
German civilians killed in World War II
German people who died in Nazi concentration camps
People from Gifhorn (district)
People who died in the Romani genocide
German male boxers
Deaths by beating in Europe
German Army personnel of World War II
Sportspeople from Lower Saxony